The 7th Yerevan Golden Apricot International Film Festival was a film festival held in Yerevan, Armenia from July 11 to 18,  2010.

This edition of the festival was dedicated to the anniversaries Arni Verno and Atom Egoyan. Other filmmakers who presented their films at the festival were Theodoros Angelopoulos and Fatih Akın.

About the Golden Apricot Yerevan International Film Festival 
The Golden Apricot Yerevan International Film Festival (GAIFF) is an annual film festival held in Yerevan, Armenia. The festival was founded in 2004 with the co-operation of the “Golden Apricot” Fund for Cinema Development, the Armenian Association of Film Critics and Cinema Journalists. The GAIFF is continually supported by the Ministry of Foreign Affairs of the RA, the Ministry of Culture of the RA and the Benevolent Fund for Cultural Development.The objectives of the festival are "to present new works by the film directors and producers in Armenia and foreign cinematographers of Armenian descent and to promote creativity and originality in the area of cinema and video art".

Awards GAIFF 2010

See also 
 Golden Apricot Yerevan International Film Festival
 Atom Egoyan
 2010 in film

References

Yerevan Golden Apricot International Film Festival
Yerevan Golden Apricot International Film Festival
Yerevan Golden Apricot International Film Festival
Yerevan Golden Apricot International Film Festival
Yerevan International Film Festival
21st century in Yerevan